The Bovenkarspel legionellosis outbreak (Legionella disaster) began on 25 February 1999 in Bovenkarspel, the Netherlands, and was one of the largest outbreaks of legionellosis in history. With at least 32 dead and 206 severe infections, it was the deadliest legionellosis outbreak since the original 1976 outbreak in Philadelphia, United States.

Between 19 and 28 February 1999, the Westfriese Flora took place in Bovenkarspel, one of the largest indoor flower exhibitions in the world (later the Holland Flowers Festival). A vendor had several recreational hot tubs on display, with one of them filled from a long-inactive firehose and heated to 37 degrees Celsius (98.6 degrees Fahrenheit). In the water that had previously stagnated inside the hose, a very aggressive type of legionella pneumophila bacterium had developed. The vendor did not add chlorine to the tubs, since customers were not permitted in them.

From 7 March, 13 patients were admitted to the Westfries Gasthuis in Hoorn.  Unable to diagnose the patients, hospital staff called the Academic Medical Center (AMC) in Amsterdam. The AMC initially diagnosed six patients with legionellosis and a link with the Westfriese Flora was soon made. On 12 March, the Netherlands National Institute for Public Health and the Environment (RIVM) issued an epidemic warning to all doctors and hospitals, alerting them to Flora visitors and people with pneumonia-like symptoms. In the following weeks, 318 cases throughout the Netherlands were reported to the RIVM. All patients had visited the Westfriese Flora after 22 February and had become ill between 25 February and 16 March. It is known that 32 people died of the infection, one of them in 2001 after prolonged illness. A further 206 people became severely ill and many developed permanent health problems after visiting the Flora.

The 318 cases exceeds the 221 in the 1976 Philadelphia outbreak.  While the Philadelphia outbreak had two more fatalities (34 versus 32), there is a possibility that others died in the 1999 Bovenkarspel outbreak, but were interred before the infection was recognized.

References

External links
A Large Outbreak of Legionnaires’ Disease at a Flower Show, the Netherlands, 1999, Jeroen W. Den Boer, Ed P.F. Yzerman, Joop Schellekens et al., Emerging Infectious Diseases, Volume 8, Number 1—January 2002 
The Westfriese Flora flower exhibition and fair, Legionnaires` Disease website
 25 februari 1999: Legionellabesmetting Westfriese Flora, Bovenkarspel, Zwaailichten disaster website (archive)

Legionellosis
1999 in the Netherlands
1999 disease outbreaks
February 1999 events in Europe
March 1999 events in Europe
Disease outbreaks in the Netherlands
History of North Holland
1999 Bovenkarspel legionellosis outbreak
1999 disasters in the Netherlands